Cytochrome c oxidase subunit 7C, mitochondrial is an enzyme that in humans is encoded by the COX7C gene.

Cytochrome c oxidase (COX), the terminal component of the mitochondrial respiratory chain, catalyzes the electron transfer from reduced cytochrome c to oxygen. This component is a heteromeric complex consisting of 3 catalytic subunits encoded by mitochondrial genes and multiple structural subunits encoded by nuclear genes. The mitochondrially-encoded subunits function in electron transfer, and the nuclear-encoded subunits may function in the regulation and assembly of the complex. This nuclear gene encodes subunit VIIc, which shares 87% and 85% amino acid sequence identity with mouse and bovine COX VIIc, respectively, and is found in all tissues. A pseudogene COX7CP1 has been found on chromosome 13.

References

External links

Further reading